Hsieh Chien-ho (born 25 November 1987) is a female Taiwanese long-distance runner. She competed in the marathon event at the 2015 World Championships in Athletics in Beijing, China.

On January 28, 2018, Hsieh placed fourth in the Osaka Half Marathon with a time of 1:12:19, breaking her own national record by three minutes.

See also
 Chinese Taipei at the 2015 World Championships in Athletics

References

1987 births
Living people
Taiwanese female long-distance runners
Place of birth missing (living people)
World Athletics Championships athletes for Chinese Taipei
Athletes (track and field) at the 2016 Summer Olympics
Olympic athletes of Taiwan
Taiwanese female marathon runners